The Lobstick River is a small river in originating in west-central Alberta, Canada. It flows north from the foothills before entering Chip Lake.  It then flows eastward through the community of Lobstick before joining the Pembina River, which in turn flows into the Athabasca River.

The Lobstick River took its name from the fur-trade era practice of creating lobsticks or lopsticks.

Tributaries
From origins to mouth, the Lobstick River receives waters from the following tributaries:
Brule Creek
Little Brule Creek
Chip Lake
Poison Creek

See also
List of Alberta rivers

References

Rivers of Alberta